Otar Military Base is a military installation of the Armed Forces of Kazakhstan located near Otar, in the Zhambyl District, Almaty Region, Kazakhstan.

Description
Military drills between Kazakhstan and its neighbors such as India, Kyrgyzstan, Mongolia and Russia. On some occasions, Cadets and enlisted personnel, are selected to undergo training at the base. Kazakhstan has held military parades at the military base in May 2013 and May 2018, in order to celebrate the Defender of the Fatherland Day holiday for the first time ever. During the latter parade, a woman was promoted to the rank of General for the first time in Kazakh military history. In early August 2018, the base hosted the Masters of Artillery Fire contest, held during the International Army Games that year.

The base is  the home of the Training Center for Junior Specialists of the Kazakh Ground Forces named for Karasai Batyr (Military Unit Number 30212), the former Soviet 80th Guards Training Motor Rifle Division.

Composition 
The base hosts the following units:

Training Center for Junior Specialists of the Kazakh Ground Forces named for Karasai Batyr 
12th Mechanized Brigade 
 54th Guards Artillery Brigade 
 23rd Engineering and Sapper Brigade 
 Central Tank Reserve Base 
 Medical Unit

References

Military installations of Kazakhstan
Jambyl Region
Parade grounds